Perin may refer to:
 Perín, a village in Slovakia
 Perin, Iran, a village in Iran
 Perin Village Site, an archeological site in the United States
 Perin (name), a list of people with the name

See also 
 Perrin (disambiguation)
 Peren (disambiguation)
 Peryn
 Pirin (disambiguation)